St Lawrence College is a co-educational independent school situated in Ramsgate, Kent and has been established as a "public school" ever since it was founded.

History 
The college was founded in 1879 as South Eastern College (colours: gold and black). The name was changed in September 1906 because of its location in the St Lawrence area of Ramsgate. New colours were also given: maroon and white. The school rapidly outgrew the single house, leading to the main building of the present day college by 1884. The chapel was completed in 1927. During the world wars, the school was evacuated to Chester (1915) and Courteenhall in Northamptonshire (1940), seat of Sir Herewood Wake, because of its position on the South-East coast. Later in the school's existence, girls were admitted, and the current mix of sexes is now roughly equal.

There were initially four houses: Light Red, Dark Red, Light Blue and Dark Blue; these later became Grange, Tower, Manor and Lodge. During World War II a fifth house was added called Courtenay when a nearby school having failed to maintain numbers was incorporated into the school. Newlands was later added for day scholars and Deacon followed as the Junior end of this house.

In 1930, Richard Maunsell designed for the Southern Railway a fleet of 40 "Schools Class" locomotives one of which was named St Lawrence. These locos were compact but particularly powerful, weighing over 100 tons with tender. As late as 1958 the St Lawrence Loco (BR 30934) was attached to the School Train departing from Ramsgate. Parts of the tender still exist on the Bluebell Railway.

Senior and middle school 
The Senior School is divided into five separate houses. The oldest, Tower and Lodge, the two boys' boarding houses, were created in 1889. Newlands is the boys' day house, while Laing is the girls' day house. Boarding girls are part of Bellerby. All houses are located in the main school building except Bellerby, who have their own building which is situated in the site of the previous Taylor Hall.

Cameron and Courtenay are mixed boarding and day sub-houses, respectively, for the Middle School (Kirby). They accommodate students from age 11 to 13. They are housed in the modern Kirby House Building, which opened in January 2007 by the Archbishop of Canterbury, Rowan Williams. In January 2013, Mark Aitken retired his post of Headmaster and was succeeded by Antony Spencer.

Junior school 
St Lawrence College Junior School is located on the same site as the Middle and Senior schools and accommodates pupils from age 3 to 11. The Junior School pupils study in the Hamblen Block which includes classrooms for Years 3-6.

Performance 
In 2009, the Daily Telegraph placed the school 330 in its League Table of Independent School A-level results, with 48.81% of pupils gaining A or B grades at A-level. In 2012, the school gained a pass rate of 92.9% with 18% of them being at grades of A and A* at A-level. The GCSE results had a pass rate of 86.5% and 15.5% being at grades of A*. 
In 2017, the school had 30% A*/A grades at A-level, and 33% A*/A at GCSE, despite the introduction of the new exams.

Notable former pupils 

Old Lawrentians (OLs) of note include:
 Alfred Bellerby, Olympic long jumper
 Hubert Broad, World War I aviator and test pilot
 John Russell Carlisle, Director of the Tobacco Manufacturers' Association
 John Carr, first-class cricketer and British Army officer
 Sir Conrad Corfield KCIE, CSI, MC and Chief Advisor in India
 Professor Durward Cruickshank FRS, crystallographer
 Michael Curtis, Newspaper Editor
 General Richard Dannatt, Baron Dannatt GCB, CBE, MC, DL, former Chief of the General Staff, defence advisor to the Conservative party.
 Gordon Edington, CBE, chair NCH
 Captain David Hart Dyke CBE, LVO, ADC, Captain of HMS Coventry during the Falklands War
 Ted Fillary, Cricketer
 Humphrey Hawksley, BBC World Affairs Correspondent (BBC News)
 John Ironmonger, Novelist
 Sir Maurice Laing CBE, DL, FRICS, construction industry entrepreneur, first president of the CBI
 Herbert Linnell, cricketer
 Eric Mansfield, Aeronautical Engineer, won the Royal Medal in 1994
 Sir George Middleton, diplomat
 Major Claude Myburgh, cricketer and soldier
 Major General Frank Crowther Roberts VC, DSO, OBE, MC
 John Ruddock, Actor
 Clifford Dyce Sharp, Journalist and Editor
 Herbert Sharp, cricketer and soldier
 Alexander Siddig, Actor
 Michael Steed, Political scientist
 The Right Honourable John Stevens, Baron Stevens of Kirkwhelpington, former commissioner of the Metropolitan Police
 Robert Summerhayes, cricketer
 John Vernon Taylor, Bishop of Winchester
 Colin Tilsley, Missionary

References

External links 
 St Lawrence College website
 Old Lawrentian Society
 Profile on the ISC website
 Profile on the HMC website

Private schools in Kent
Boarding schools in Kent
Ramsgate
Educational institutions established in 1879
1879 establishments in England
Member schools of the Headmasters' and Headmistresses' Conference